Crosby Garrett is a civil parish in the Eden District, Cumbria, England. It contains 13 buildings that are recorded in the National Heritage List for England. Of these, one is listed at Grade I, the highest of the three grades, two are at Grade II*, the middle grade, and the others are at Grade II, the lowest grade.  The parish contains the village of Crosby Garrett and the surrounding countryside.  The listed buildings consists of a church, houses and associated structures, farmhouses, farm buildings, two railway viaducts, a pair of limekilns, and a boundary stone.


Key

Buildings

References

Citations

Sources

Lists of listed buildings in Cumbria